Lynstone is a hamlet near Bude in north Cornwall, England. At the 2011 census the population at the 2011 census was included in the civil parish of Bude-Stratton.

References

Hamlets in Cornwall
Bude